Wilfredo Rosado is an American jewelry designer. He held various positions at Armani and worked for Interview magazine before becoming a luxury high jeweler. In 2011, Rosado founded his eponymous high jewelry collection. He launched the fine jewelry line W. Rosado in 2020.

Life and career 
Rosado was born in New Jersey to Puerto Rican parents. He took an interest in fashion at a young age and would read international fashion magazines.

Rosado studied biology for two years at New York University. He wanted to become a doctor but still had a passion for fashion. On weekends he worked at a shop called Parachute in SoHo, Manhattan. While still in school, he was recruited in 1984 to work at the first Giorgio Armani boutique in New York City. After a summer of working at Armani, he intended to resume school in the fall, but he was drawn to the business of fashion and never returned. He went from doing sales to visual merchandising.

Rosado met pop artist Andy Warhol and was offered a job at Interview magazine's fashion department. He became part of Warhol's inner circle and was immersed in New York City's downtown art and club scene where he also befriended artists Jean-Michel Basquiat and Keith Haring. Rosado is mentioned often in The Andy Warhol Diaries (1989).

After Warhol died in 1987, Rosado remained at Interview for a short while before doing a stint at Fame magazine. Afterward, he returned to Armani as the head of PR for Emporio Armani, then he joined the design team and relocated to Milan for two years.

In 2011, Rosado launched his namesake high jewelry brand. Shortly after, actress Gwyneth Paltrow wore pink earrings by Wilfredo Rosado during her performance with singer CeeLo Green at the 2011 Grammys.

Rosado designed singer Mariah Carey's 35-carat diamond and platinum engagement ring from Australian billionaire James Packer.

In 2020, he launched the fine jewelry line W. Rosado.

He designed the pearl necklace worn by Vice President Kamala Harris at the Inauguration of Joe Biden in 2021.

Rosado appeared in the Netflix docuseries The Andy Warhol Diaries (2022).

References

External links 

 Official website
 Wilfredo Rosado on IMDb

American jewelry designers
Businesspeople from New Jersey
LGBT Hispanic and Latino American people
Living people
Year of birth missing (living people)